The Century Handicap was an American Thoroughbred horse race held annually from 1901 through 1909 at Sheepshead Bay Race Track in Brooklyn, New York. A Weight for Age race open to horses age three and older, it was contested on dirt over a distance of a mile and a half (12 furlongs).

Run as the Century Stakes until 1908, the race was last run in September 1909 after the Republican controlled New York Legislature under Governor Charles Evans Hughes passed the Hart–Agnew anti-betting legislation on June 11, 1908. The owners of Sheepshead Bay Race Track, and other racing facilities in New York State, struggled to stay in business without betting. However, further restrictive legislation was passed by the New York Legislature in 1910 which resulted in the deepening of the financial crisis for track operators and led to a complete shut down of racing across the state during 1911 and 1912. When a Court ruling saw racing return in 1913 it was too late for the Sheepshead Bay facility and it never reopened.

Records
Speed record:
  2:30.60 – Ballot (1908) (new track record)

Most wins:
 2 – Ballot (1907, 1908)

Most wins by a jockey:
 2 – David Nicol (1905, 1907)

Most wins by a trainer:
 3 – James G. Rowe, Sr. (1905, 1907, 1908)

Most wins by an owner:
 3 – James R. Keene (1905, 1907, 1908)

Winners

Notes

References
 The Century Stakes,  New York Times – September 8, 1901
 The Century Stakes,  New York Times – September 12, 1909

Discontinued horse races in New York City
Sheepshead Bay Race Track
Open middle distance horse races
Recurring sporting events established in 1901
Recurring events disestablished in 1909
1901 establishments in New York City
1909 disestablishments in New York (state)